Alexandra Winkfield Timpson MBE (née Dodd; 25 April 1946 – 5 January 2016) was a British campaigner for children's rights.

She grew up in Lymm, Cheshire. Together with her husband John Timpson, she had three children (including politician Edward Timpson, adopted two more, and fostered at least ninety other children.

In the 2006 New Year Honours, she was appointed a Member of the Order of the British Empire (MBE) "for services to Children and Families".

References

1946 births
2016 deaths
Members of the Order of the British Empire
People from Lymm
Wives of knights